Lepas australis is a species of goose barnacle in the family Lepadidae. It is found in New Zealand.

References

External links

 

Barnacles
Crustaceans described in 1851